The James Stevens lifeboats were a series of twenty lifeboats which were purchased by the Royal National Lifeboat Institution (RNLI) using a £50,000 legacy received in 1894 from the estate of Mr James Stevens, of The Reform Club, Birmingham, UK, an Edgbaston property developer, which was provided for this purpose. This donation provided more boats than any other donation received by the RNLI. (Mrs Sue Denny, Spokeswoman for The RNLI).

Two of the lifeboats, No. 10 and No. 14, are still seaworthy.

Fleet

See also
 List of shipwrecks of Cornwall (20th century)

References

External links

No.2
 Model replica of No. 2

No.3
 1904 – Period photo of James Stevens Returning to Gorleston harbour

No.5
 1909 – Photo of the crew of the No. 5
 Early 1900s, Photo of No. 5 Under Sail
 Early 1900s, Photo of No. 5 on show in Fore St

No.6 
 High quality period photo of No. 6
 Another high quality period photo of No. 6
 Lower quality later period photo of No. 6
 Lower quality period photo of No. 6 at sea
 Lower quality period photo of No. 6 at sea

No.9
 Folio 244 of 1922: William Watkins Ltd and others, the owners, masters and crews of Arcadia, Hibernia and Uincia and George Mussell, Coxswain, and the crew of Southend on Sea Lifeboat James Stevens No. 9 v Orcades. Case no: W1285. Brief notes of proceedings.

No.10
 Contemporary photo of No. 10, 2005
 Contemporary photo of No. 10, March 2007
 Contemporary photo of No. 10, June 2015
 No.10 reported "sunk in Hayle Estuary", December 2015
 No.10 listed for sale, "has been laid up ashore for some time", date unknown
 recently undergone a 3 year restoration and now offering historic lifeboat trips around St.Ives Bay May 2022 

No.13
 Photo of No. 13

No.14
 Period photo of No.14, 1900

Royal National Lifeboat Institution lifeboats